Tömük is a town in Mersin Province, Turkey.

Geography 
Tömük is in the rural area of Erdemli district, which is a part of Mersin Province. The population was 10 907. as of 2012.

History 

The earliest settlers were the members of a Turkmen tribe of a certain Elvan Bey in the 14th century. They founded the village of Elvanlı a few kilometers east of Tömük. Tömük was a just a hamlet used occasionally by the Elvanlı residents. But, early in the last years of the 18th century, people from other villages began to populate Tömük. In 1969, Tömük was declared a township.

Economy 
The major economic activity is citrus horticulture. Olive, tomato and green pepper are among the other important crops. Services for summer houses in the coastal band also contribute to town economy.

References 

Populated places in Mersin Province
Populated coastal places in Turkey
Seaside resorts in Turkey
Towns in Turkey
Populated places in Erdemli District